A traffic collision, also known as a car crash, is when one or more cars crash into something.

Car Crash or Carcrash may also refer to:

 "Car Crash" (Matt Nathanson song), on the album Some Mad Hope
 "Car Crash" (Our Lady Peace song), on the album Clumsy
 "Car Crash" (Powerman 5000 song), on the album The Blood-Splat Rating System
 "Car Crash" (Avengers song), on the EP We Are the One
 "Car Crash" (Dirty Americans song), a song by Dirty Americans
 Carcrash International, an English rock music group
 "Carcrash" (Esbjörn Svensson Trio song), on the album Strange Place for Snow
 "Carcrash" (Section 25 song), on the album Love & Hate
 Car Crash (film), a 1981 Italian-Spanish-Mexican action film

See also

 Car (disambiguation)
 Crash (disambiguation)
 List of car crash songs